Stomatanthes is a genus of African and South American plants in the tribe Eupatorieae within the family Asteraceae.

Classification 
Although Stomatanthes is classified in the subtribe Eupatoriinae in the influential 1987 classification of King and Robinson, subsequent research shows that it belongs elsewhere in the tribe Eupatorieae, as it is not closely related to Eupatorium or Eutrochium.

 Species
 Stomatanthes africanus (Oliv. & Hiern) R.M.King & H.Rob. - central + southern Africa
 Stomatanthes corumbensis (B.L.Rob.) H.Rob. -  Brazil (Minas Gerais, Mato Grosso, Goiás)
 Stomatanthes dentatus (Gardner) H.Rob. - Bolivia, Brazil (Minas Gerais, Mato Grosso, Goiás, São Paulo)
 Stomatanthes dictyophyllus (DC.) R.M.King & H.Rob. - Brazil (Minas Gerais, Mato Grosso, Goiás, São Paulo)
 Stomatanthes helenae (Buscal. & Muschl.) Lisowski - central Africa
 Stomatanthes hirsutus H.Rob. - Brazilia Distrito Federal 
 Stomatanthes loefgrenii (B.L.Rob.) H.Rob. - São Paulo
 Stomatanthes meyeri R.M.King & H.Rob. - Ethiopia
 Stomatanthes oblongifolius (Sch.Bip. ex Baker) H.Rob. - Uruguay, Brazil (Rio Grande do Sul, Santa Catarina, Paraná, Minas Gerais, São Paulo)
 Stomatanthes pernambucensis (B.L.Rob.) H.Rob. - Brazil (Pernambuco, Mato Grosso, Goiás
 Stomatanthes pinnatipartitus (Sch.Bip. ex Baker) H.Rob. - Brazil (Minas Gerais, Mato Grosso, Goiás, São Paulo)
 Stomatanthes polycephalus (Sch.Bip. ex B.L.Rob.) H.Rob. - Brazil (Minas Gerais, Bahia)
 Stomatanthes reticulatus Grossi & J.N.Nakaj. - Brazil (Minas Gerais)
 Stomatanthes subcapitatus (Malme) H.Rob. - Brazil (Paraná, São Paulo)
 Stomatanthes trigonus (Gardner) H.Rob.	 - Bolivia, Brazil (Minas Gerais, Mato Grosso do Sul, Rondônia, Goiás)
 Stomatanthes warmingii (Baker) H.Rob. - Brazil (Minas Gerais)
 Stomatanthes zambiensis R.M.King & H.Rob. - Malawi, Zambia

References

External links 
 Stomatanthes africanus (Oliv. & Hiern) R.M. King & H. Rob., Flora of Zimbabwe.  Includes photos.

Eupatorieae
Asteraceae genera